U.S. Route 51 or U.S. Highway 51 (US 51) is a major south-north United States highway that extends  from the western suburbs of New Orleans, Louisiana, to within  of the Wisconsin–Michigan state line. As most of the United States Numbered Highways ending with "1", it is a cross-country north-south route extending from the Gulf Coast region to the Great Lakes region. Much of the highway in northern Illinois and southern Wisconsin runs parallel to or is cosigned with Interstate 39 (I-39) and much of the route in several states also parallels the Illinois Central Railroad. From LaPlace, Louisiana, Mississippi, to Memphis, Tennessee, much of that portion of US 51 runs largely parallel or is concurrent with Interstate 55 (I-55). The highway's northern terminus is between Hurley, Wisconsin, and Ironwood, Michigan, where it ends with a Trumpet interchange at US 2. Its southern terminus is in Laplace, Louisiana, ending at US 61. US 51 is routed through the states of Louisiana, Mississippi, Tennessee, Kentucky, Illinois, and Wisconsin.

In addition to singing about US 61 on his album Highway 61 Revisited, musician Bob Dylan also commemorated US 51, covering the folk song "Highway 51 Blues", earlier recorded by both Curtis Jones and Tommy McClennan, on his eponymous album Bob Dylan. The North Mississippi Allstars also paid tribute to the highway in the title track of their album 51 Phantom.

In Memphis, Tennessee, all of US 51 south of South Parkway East was renamed from Bellevue Boulevard to Elvis Presley Boulevard on January 17, 1972. Graceland is located on this section of the highway, in the subdivision of Whitehaven.

In 2004, the six states that US 51 traverses banded together as the Explore Hwy 51 Coalition to help promote this "All-American Road". The group now offers visitor information for traveling the length of the road.

Route description

Louisiana

US 51 begins at the intersection with US 61 in Laplace and heads northeast. It intersects I-10 before running concurrently with I-55. Near the interchange with I-12, the route splits from I-55. It intersects US 190 in Hammond and remains running parallel with I-55 before entering Mississippi. In the 1930s, this highway was called Jefferson Davis Highway.

Mississippi
US 51 enters Mississippi from Louisiana in Osyka and runs parallel with I-55. It intersects US 98 in McComb and US 84 south of Brookhaven. Northwest of Crystal Springs, it runs concurrently with I-55 and then splits at the interchange with I-20 in Jackson. The highway then runs through Jackson, intersecting US 80. Outside Ridgeland, it passes under I-55 as it continues northeast. It continues through Canton, Pickens, Goodman, and Durant. The highway continues to run along I-55, intersecting US 82 in Winona and US 278 in Batesville. The route passes under I-69 before entering Tennessee.

The Mississippi section of US 51 is defined at Mississippi Code Annotated § 65-3-3.

Tennessee

US 51 enters Tennessee from Mississippi and travels through Memphis. It intersects I-55 and then I-240 before intersecting US 78. It then runs concurrently with US 79 before intersecting I-69. As it exits Memphis, it intersects I-40 and heads northeasterly. In Dyersburg, it runs concurrently with US 412 for a half a mile before intersecting I-155's eastern terminus. US 51 then continues northeasterly before entering Kentucky. US 51 between Memphis and Kentucky is planned on running concurrently with I-69.

Kentucky

US 51 enters Kentucky at Fulton, running concurrently with I-69 and continues northward through the towns of Clinton, Bardwell and Wickliffe to the Ohio River. The route intersects and runs concurrently with US 62 before separating from it in Cairo. Along the way it also intersects US 60. The route then enters Illinois before running concurrently with I-57.

Illinois

US 51 enters Illinois from Kentucky at the city of Cairo. The route remains two lanes from Dongola to just before Assumption with the exception of a  section between Centralia and I-64.

North of Assumption, US 51 becomes an expressway to Decatur. In Decatur, US 51 follows I-72 to bypass town. US 51 leaves I-72 after , and heads north to Bloomington–Normal as an expressway.

US 51 follows I-39, intersecting I-80 and I-88 along the way. The highway also follows US 20 south of Rockford (while still following I-39). I-39/US 51 joins I-90, making US 51 one of the only toll roads in Illinois that is a U.S. Highway. US 51 exits I-39/I-90 just a mile south of the Wisconsin state line. US 51 follows Illinois Route 75 (IL 75) west to the intersection of IL 251, then turns north through South Beloit to enter Wisconsin.

Wisconsin

In the state of Wisconsin, US 51 enters from Illinois at Beloit. US 51 splits off from I-39/I-90 in South Beloit, Illinois and continues northward through Janesville and Edgerton. In Edgerton, US 51 rejoins I-39/I-90 for  before splitting off towards Stoughton and McFarland. US 51 runs almost parallel to I-39/I-90 through the eastern portion of Madison, crosses the Interstate in DeForest, and finally rejoins I-39 again at Portage. US 51 runs concurrently with I-39 until I-39's terminus in Wausau and continues on as a mixture of freeway and expressway until just north of the interchange with US 8. From there through Hazelhurst, US 51 is a two-lane road with sporadic three-lane sections (which were constructed in 2008). US 51 expands to four lanes, with a central fifth turn lane from Hazelhurst to Arbor Vitae; north of Arbor Vitae it returns to two lanes and continues to its northern end in Hurley, where it terminates at US 2.

Major intersections
Louisiana
  in LaPlace
  in LaPlace
  northeast of LaPlace. The highways travel concurrently to Hammond.
  in Hammond
Mississippi
  in McComb
  south of Brookhaven
  in Crystal Springs. The highways travel concurrently to Jackson.
  in Jackson. The highways travel concurrently through the city.
  in Jackson
  in Winona
  in Batesville
Tennessee
  in Memphis
  in Memphis
  in Memphis. US 51/US 64/US 70/US 79 travels concurrently through the city.
  in Memphis
  in Memphis
  in Memphis
  in Millington
  in Dyersburg. The highways travel concurrently through the city.
  in Dyersburg. I-69/US 51 travels concurrently to southwest of Troy.
  northeast of Union City. The highways travel concurrently to South Fulton.
  in South Fulton
Kentucky
  in Fulton. The highways travel concurrently through the city.
  in Bardwell. The highways travel concurrently to Cairo, Illinois.
  in Wickliffe. The highways travel concurrently to Cairo, Illinois.
Illinois
  in Cairo. The highways travel concurrently to near Dongola.
  in Richview
  in Sandoval. The highways travel concurrently through the village.
  in Vandalia Township. The highways travel concurrently to Vandalia.
  in Vandalia
  in Harristown
  in Harristown. The highways travel concurrently to Decatur.
  in Bloomington Township. The highways travel concurrently to northwest of Normal.
  in Bloomington. The highways travel concurrently to Normal.
  in Bloomington
  in Normal. I-39/US 51 travels concurrently to South Beloit.
  in El Paso
  in LaSalle
  in LaSalle
  on the Troy Grove–Ophir township line
  in Mendota Township
  on the Amboy–Franklin Grove township line
  in Dement Township
  in Rockford. The highways travel concurrently to Cherry Valley.
  in Cherry Valley. The highways travel concurrently to South Beloit.
Wisconsin
  in the Town of Janesville
  in the Town of Albion. The highways travel concurrently through the town.
  in Madison
  in Madison
  in the Town of Burke
  in the Town of Fort Winnebago. The highways travel concurrently to the Town of Rib Mountain.
  in Stevens Point. The highways travel concurrently to the Town of Hull.
  in the Town of King
  in the Town of Kimball

See also

References

External links
Endpoints of US 51

 
51
51
051
051